List of cycleways — for all types of cycleways, bike path, bike route, or bikeway's transportation infrastructure and/or designated route,  listed by continents and their countries.

Greenways and/or rail trails can include a cycleway−bike path.

Asia 
Tibetan Plateau Cycling Routes (along Sichuan and Yunnan Chinese provinces) 1600 km]

Hong Kong

For main article, see Cycleways in Hong Kong.
New Territories Cycle Track Network (under development)
Shing Mun River
Tai Lam Mountain Bike Trail
Tolo Harbour

India
Agra-Etawah Cycle Highway

Philippines

Marikina
Pasig
Quezon City

Taiwan
 Jiahou Line Bikeway
 Old Caoling Tunnel

Europe

EuroVelo routes

North - South routes
EV 1 - Atlantic Coast Route: North Cape - Sagres 8,186 km
EV 3 - Pilgrims Route: Trondheim - Santiago de Compostela 5,122 km
EV 5 - Via Romea Francigena: London - Rome and Brindisi 3,900 km
EV 7 - Middle Europe Route: North Cape - Malta 6,000 km
EV 9 - Baltic Sea to Adriatic Sea (Amber Route): Gdańsk - Pula 1,930 km
EV 11 - East Europe Route: North Cape - Athens 5,964 km
EV 13 - Iron Curtain Route: Barents Sea - Black Sea 10,400 km

West - East routes
EV 2 - Capitals Route: Galway - Moscow 5,500 km
EV 4 - Roscoff - Kiev 4,000 km
EV 6 - Atlantic Ocean to Black Sea (Rivers Route): Nantes - Constanţa 3,653 km
EV 8 - Mediterranean Route: Cádiz - Athens 5,388 km

Circuits
EV 10 - Baltic Sea Cycle Route (Hansa circuit): 7,930 km
EV 12 - North Sea Cycle Route: 5,932 km

France
 Cycleways in France 
 , a cycling route alongside the Rhône

Germany
Berlin-Copenhagen Cycle Route
Donauradweg
Elbe Cycle Route
Via Claudia Augusta

Italy
 Rete ciclabile nazionale italiana
 Ciclovia Adriatica

The Netherlands
LF-routes, a network of marked cycle routes through the Netherlands
 other European cycle routes
 Other long-distance routes

Republic of Ireland

 Great Southern Trail 
 Great Western Greenway
 Waterford Greenway

Spain

1800 km of public greenways on former railway routes throughout Spain  
TransAndalus 
TransCAM - Trans-Comunidad Autónoma de Madrid

United Kingdom

National Cycle Network
The National Byway

England
List of cycle routes in England

London
List of cycle routes in London

Northern Ireland
National Cycle Route 9

Wales
List of cycle routes in Wales

Scotland
National Cycle Route 74
National Cycle Route 75
National Cycle Route 76
National Cycle Route 77
National Cycle Route 78

Oceania

Australia

Queensland
Brisbane Bikeways, Brisbane
Gold Coast Bikeways, Gold Coast
Gold Coast Oceanway

Western Australia

cycleways in Perth and surrounding areas

South Australia
Adelaide Southern Veloway
Mawson Trail
Rattler Rail Trail
Riesling Trail

Victoria
Bass Coast Rail Trail
Cycling in Melbourne
Great Southern Rail Trail

New South Wales
Fernleigh Track
New South Wales

New Zealand
Little River Rail Trail
New Zealand Cycleway
Northwestern Cycleway
Otago Central Rail Trail
Timber Trail

North America

Canada
Trans Canada Trail

British Columbia
Central Valley Greenway - Greater Vancouver
Galloping Goose Regional Trail - Victoria
Lochside Regional Trail - Victoria
 Spirit Trail - North Vancouver, West Vancouver
 The Green Necklace - North Vancouver

Ontario
Aviation Pathway - Ottawa
Bike Trails in Ottawa
Capital Pathway - Ottawa
Experimental Farm Pathway - Ottawa
Ganatchio Trail - Windsor
Greenbelt Pathway - Ottawa
Little River Extension - Windsor
Ottawa River Pathway - Ottawa
Pinecrest Creek Pathway - Ottawa
Rideau Canal Western Pathway - Ottawa
Rideau Canal Eastern Pathway - Ottawa
Rideau River Eastern Pathway - Ottawa
Riverfront Bike Trail - Windsor
Watts Creek Pathway - Ottawa

Quebec
Parc Linéaire Le P'tit Train du Nord
Route Verte
Sentier De l'île - Gatineau
Sentier des Pionniers - Gatineau
Sentier de la Rivière-Gatineau - Gatineau
Sentier du Lac-des-Fées - Gatineau
Sentier du Lac-Leamy - Gatineau
Sentier du Parc-de-la-Gatineau - Gatineau
Sentier du Ruisseau-de-la-Brasserie - Gatineau
Sentier du Ruisseau-Leamy - Gatineau
Sentier du Voyageurs - Gatineau

United States
 Rail trail
 List of rail trails

Multi-State

Adirondack Park Loop Bicycle Route
Allegheny Mountains Loop Bicycle Route
American Discovery Trail
Atlantic Coast Bicycle Route
Bicycle Route 66
East Coast Greenway 
Grand Canyon Connector Bicycle Route
Great Divide Mountain Bike Route
Great Parks Bicycle Route
Great Rivers South Bicycle Route
Green Mountains Loop Bicycle Route
Idaho Hot Springs Mountain Bike Route
Lake Erie Connector Bicycle Route
Lewis & Clark Bicycle Trail
Mississippi River Trail
Pacific Crest Bicycle Trail
North Lakes Bicycle Route
Northern Tier Bicycle Route
Pacific Coast Bicycle Route
Sierra Cascades Bicycle Route
Southern Tier Bicycle Route
Spokane River Centennial Trail, WA-ID
Tidewater Potomac Heritage Bicycle Route
TransAmerica Bicycle Trail
Underground Railroad Bicycle Route
United States Bicycle Route System
Western Express Bicycle Route

Alabama
 Chief Ladiga Trail

Arizona
 The Loop, Tucson

California

Northern California
Alameda Creek Regional Trail
Contra Costa County trails, San Francisco Bay Area
Davis Bike Path
Guadalupe River Trail
Highway 87 Bikeway
Highway 237 Bikeway
Iron Horse Regional Trail
Jedediah Smith Memorial Trail, Sacramento
John W. Christian Greenbelt
Los Gatos Creek Trail
Ohlone Greenway
San Francisco Bay Trail
Stevens Creek Trail
The Wiggle, San Francisco

Southern California
List of Los Angeles bike paths
List of Orange County bike paths
List of San Diego bike paths
Arroyo Seco bicycle path 
Ballona Creek bicycle path
Coyote Creek bicycle path
Culver Boulevard Median Bike Path
Kern River Parkway
Long Beach Green Belt path
Los Angeles River bicycle path
Los Angeles River Bikeway
Marvin Braude Bike Trail,  Santa Monica Bay
G Line bicycle path, San Fernando Valley
Mission Bay bike path
Rio Hondo bicycle path
San Diego Creek bicycle path
San Gabriel River Bike Trail
San Luis Rey River bike path
Santa Ana River Trail
Santa Clara River Trail
Shoreline Pedestrian Bikepath
Silver Strand bikeway

Colorado
Boulder
Historic Arkansas Riverwalk, in Pueblo

Connecticut
Air Line State Park Trail
Farmington Canal Trail
Hop River State Park Trail 
Charter Oak Greenway
Larkin State Park Trail 
Moosup Valley State Park Trail
Putnam River Trail

Delaware
Delaware Bicycle Route 1
Jack A. Markell Trail
Junction and Breakwater Trail
Michael N. Castle Trail

Florida
List of Florida paved bike trails
Alden Road Bicycle Path
Auburndale TECO Trail
Baldwin Park Trail
Bear Creek Nature Trail
Blackwater Heritage State Trail
Boca Grande Bike Path
Cady Way Trail
Candyland Park Trail
Cape Haze Pioneer Trail
Chain of Lakes Trail
Citrus Trail
Clermont Trail
Coast-to-Coast Connector trail
Country Club Trail
Courtney Campbell Causeway, at seminolecountyfl.gov
Cross Seminole Trail
Dinky Line Trail
E. E. Williamson Trail
East Central Regional Rail Trail
Flagler Trail Flagler Trail, at seminolecountyfl.gov
Flatwoods Park Trail
Florida Connector Bicycle Route
Florida Keys Overseas Heritage Trail
Florida National Scenic Trail (mostly unpaved)
Fort Fraser Trail
Gainesville-Depot Avenue Trail
Gainesville-Hawthorne Trail State Park
Gainesville-Waldo Road Greenway
General James A. Van Fleet State Trail 
Good Neighbor Trail
Jacksonville-Baldwin Rail Trail
John Yarbrough Linear Park
Kewannee Trail
Lake Minneola Scenic Trail
Lake Okeechobee Scenic Trail
Lake-to-Lake Trail
Legacy Trail
Little Econ Greenway
Marjorie Harris Carr Cross Florida Greenway
Metropath
Nature Coast State Trail
Palatka-Lake Butler State Trail
Pensacola Beach Trail
Pine Hills Trail
Pinellas Trail
Rinehart Road to Riverwalk Connector
Riverwalk Trail
Seminole Wekiva Trail
South Dade Rail Trail
South Lake Trail
Spring to Spring Trail
Suncoast Trail, developed in conjunction with the Suncoast Parkway
Suwannee River Greenway at Branford
Tallahassee-Georgia Florida and Alabama (GF&A) Trail
Tallahassee-St. Marks Historic Railroad State Trail
University Trail
Upper Tampa Bay Trail
Venetian Waterway Park
West Orange Trail
Wirz Park Trail
Withlacoochee State Trail

Georgia
 List of Georgia State Bicycle Routes
 BeltLine
 Big Creek Greenway
 PATH400
 Silver Comet Trail
 Western Gwinnett Bikeway

Hawaii
Oahu Bike Routes

Idaho
 Boise River Greenbelt
 Trail of the Coeur d'Alenes

Illinois
Bicycling in Chicago
Chicago lakefront trail
Grand Illinois Trail - 535 miles
Illinois Prairie Path

Indiana
Anderson Trails: Anderson 
Bluffton Rivergreenway: (2.5 miles) Bluffton 
Calumet Trail: Northwest Indiana, located along the utility right-of-way in the Indiana Dunes National Park
Cardinal Greenway: rail trail (60 miles, longest trail in Indiana) Richmond to Marion 
Decatur Rivergreenway:
Erie Lackawanna Trail: Hammond to Crown Point
Fort Wayne Rivergreenway and Pufferbelly Trail: Fort Wayne, Indiana 
Indianapolis Cultural Trail: (8.1 miles)
Industrial Heritage Trail: (2.42 miles) Kokomo. When complete, the Industrial Heritage Trail will extend the Nickel Plate Trail from Cassville through Kokomo 
Monon Trail: Indianapolis, Carmel and Westfield 
New Haven Rivergreenway: 
Nickel Plate Trail: rail trail (38 miles) Rochester to Cassville (near Kokomo) 
Oak Savannah Trail: Griffith to Hobart 
Panhandle Pathway: (22 miles) South of Winamac, Indiana in Cass County to outside Logansport in Pulaski County with plans to extend the trail into Winamac
Pennsy Greenway: Lansing, Illinois to Schererville
Porter-Brickyard Trail: Porter, Indiana, linking the Calumet Trail to the Prairie Duneland Trail in Chesterton, partially in the Indiana Dunes National Park.
Potter's Bridge Trail: Noblesville
Hagan Burke Trail:  Carmel, Indiana
Midland Trace Trail:  Westfield, Indiana
Prairie Duneland Trail: Portage to Chesterton
Pumpkinvine Nature Trail: Elkhart and LaGrange Counties 
White River Greenway: Muncie
White River Wapahani Trail: Indianapolis
Wildcat Walk of Excellence: (3.34 Miles) Kokomo. Intersects with Industrial Heritage Trail along the Wildcat Creek in downtown Kokomo.

Iowa
Cedar Valley Trail 
Chichaqua Valley Trail
Clive Greenbelt Trail
Great Western Bike Trail of Central Iowa
Heart of Iowa Nature Trail
Heritage Trail
High Trestle Trail - formerly Ankeny to Woodward Trail
Krushchev in Iowa Trail - formerly Corn Diplomacy Trail
Raccoon River Valley Trail
Summerset Trail
T-Bone Trail
Wabash Trace Nature Trail

Kansas
Wichita has a system of 46.9 miles (75.5 km) of dedicated (off-street) bicycle paths, providing access to most parts of the city.

Kentucky
Cherokee Park Loop (Louisville)
Levee Bike Trail (Louisville)
Metro Loop- planned 110 mile trail around Louisville (to be complete by 2017)
Mill Creek Bike Trail (Louisville)
Riverwalk Bike Trail (Louisville)

Louisiana
 Comite/Hooper Trail - Baton Rouge
 Mississippi River Trail
 Tammany Trace

Maryland
 Allegheny Highlands Trail of Maryland
 Baltimore & Annapolis Trail
 Chesapeake and Ohio Canal Path
 Capital Crescent Trail
 Washington, Baltimore and Annapolis Trail

Massachusetts
Boston
Cape Cod and the Islands
Central Massachusetts
Metro Boston
Minuteman Bikeway
North Shore
Somerville Community Path
South Shore
Western Massachusetts

Michigan
 Grayling Bicycle Turnpike
 Lansing River Trail
 M-185 on Mackinac Island
 Northern Tier Trail in East Lansing

Minnesota
Blufflands State Trail (Root River trail and Harmony-Preston Valley trail)
Cannon Valley Trail
Cedar Lake Trail
Central Lakes Trail
Douglas State Trail
Gateway State Trail
Grand Rounds Scenic Byway
Lake Wobegon Trails
Luce Line State Trail
Midtown Greenway
Paul Bunyan Trail
Sakatah Singing Hills State Trail
Southwest LRT Trail
Willard Munger State Trail

Mississippi
 Longleaf Trace

Missouri
Katy Trail State Park

Montana
 Gallagator Linear Trail
 Bitteroot Trail
 Sourdough Trail

Nebraska

 Cowboy Trail
 Jamaica North Trail
 MoPac Trail

New Hampshire
Franconia Notch and Presidentials Rail Trail

New Jersey

Edgar Felix Bikeway
Henry Hudson Trail
Sussex, Paulinskill Valley, Columbia, and Delaware & Raritan Rail trails and the Lowantaka Recreation Path
Traction Line Recreation Trail, Morris Township

New Mexico
List of New Mexico State Bike Routes

New York
List of trails in New York
List of New York State Bicycle Routes
Adirondack Park Loop Bicycle Route
Brooklyn-Queens Greenway
Lake Minnewaska Bike Trail
Manhattan Waterfront Greenway
North County Trailway
South County Trailway
Walkill Valley Rail Trail
Westchester and Putnam County Trailways

North Carolina
List of bicycle routes in North Carolina
American Tobacco Trail

Ohio
Conotton Creek Trail
Lebanon Countryside Trail
Little Miami Scenic Trail
List of rail trails#Ohio
North Coast Inland Trail
Miami Valley Rail Trails
Rail Trails, Towpaths And Other Trails In Ohio

Oklahoma
Legacy Trail

Oregon
Banks-Vernonia State Trail- (paved 21 miles)

Pennsylvania
Abandoned Pennsylvania Turnpike
BicyclePA Routes
Chester Valley Rail Trail
Cross County Trail
Cynwyd Heritage Trail
Ghost Town Trail
Liberty Bell Trail
P&W Trail
Pennypack Trail
Perkiomen Trail
Power Line Trail
Reading Viaduct
Schuylkill River Trail
US 202 Parkway Trail

Rhode Island
Blackstone River Bikeway
East Bay Bike Path
South County Bike Path

South Dakota
George S. Mickelson Rail Trail

Tennessee
Maryville Alcoa Greenway
Tennessee Riverwalk, Chattanooga
Shelby Park (Nashville), Nashville (Shelby Bottoms Greenway)

Texas
Austin Veloway (Cycle and Skate Trail - South of Austin in Travis County)
George Bush Park (Hike & Bike Trail - West of Houston in Harris County)
Terry Hershey Park (Hike & Bike Trail - West of Houston in Harris County)
Northeast Texas Trail (132 miles)

Utah
Jordan River Parkway - Utah Lake to Thanksgiving Point
Jordan River Parkway - Salt Lake County
Union Pacific Rail Trail (Park City to Echo Reservoir)
Utah Cliffs Loop Bicycle Route
Utah Mountain Biking

Vermont
Vermont Bike Trails

Virginia
Washington and Old Dominion Trail

Washington
 Burke-Gilman Trail (20 miles)
 Chehalis Western Trail, Olympia, WA (21 miles)
Chief Sealth Trail
 Green River Trail, King County, WA (19 miles)
 Interurban Trail, King County, WA (14 miles)
 Olympic Discovery Bike Trail, Sequim-Port Angeles, WA (23 miles paved)
 Pierce County Foothills Trail, Puyallup-South Prairie, WA (11 miles)
 Spokane River Centennial Trail, Spokane, WA (37 miles)
 Washington Parks Bicycle Route
 Yelm Tenino-Trail, WA (14 miles)

Wisconsin
400 State Trail - -  The 400 State Trail connects to the Elroy-Sparta State Trail in Elroy.
Ahnapee State Trail -
Alpha Mountain Bike Trail
Badger State Trail
Bearskin State Trail
Buffalo River State Trail
Burlington-Kansasville State Trail
Capital City State Trail
Cattail State Trail
Chippewa River State Trail
Devil's River State Trail
Eisenbahn State Trail
Elroy-Sparta State Trail
Fox River State Recreational Trail
Friendship State Trail
Gandy Dancer State Trail
Glacial Drumlin State Trail
Great River State Trail
Green Circle State Trail
Hank Aaron State Trail
Hillsboro State Trail
La Crosse River State Trail
Mascoutin Valley State Trail
Military Ridge State Trail
Mountain-Bay State Trail
Newton Blackmour State Trail
Nicolet State Trail
Oak Leaf Trail
Oconto River State Trail
Old Abe State Trail
Ozaukee Interurban Trail
Pecatonica State Trail
Red Cedar State Trail
Saunders State Trail
Sugar River State Trail
Stower Seven Lakes State Trail
Three Eagle Trail
Tomorrow River State Trail
Tuscobia State Trail
White River State Trail
Wild Goose State Trail
Wild Rivers State Trail
Wiouwash State Trail
Wolf River State Trail

South America

Colombia
Bogotá - The Ciclovía, 110 kilometers of roads throughout the city, which are highways that are closed to cars during the Sundays and open only to bikes. And over 313 km of cycleways designed exclusively for bikes to be used any day, any time.

Argentina

Patagonia
Arroyo Las Bayas 
Bariloche
Bariloche (Small Circuit)
Bosque de Arrayanes, Villa la Angostura 
Catedral Tour de los Lagos
Parque Nacional Los Alerces expedition trail
San Martín de los Andes
-See also:
Diary by James Middleton: Alaska to Ushuaia
Get acquainted: Awesome Paradisiacal Patagonia

Mendoza
Mendoza: A Four Km Underground Bike Path to Chile

Argentina/Chile
Palena Valley Circuit expedition trail

Chile
Andes to the Pacific expedition trail
Futaleufu River Valley expedition trail

See also 

 
 
 List of long-distance footpaths
 List of rail trails
 Outline of cycling
 Offroad cycling
 Road bicycle racing
 Track cycling

References

External links
Openstreetmap.org:  OpenCycleMap website + homepage — public user developed 'wiki-map' of cycle routes + bike paths.
Maps and guides for Australian rides on Cyclewayz app

 01
C
.01
Lists of routes
Road transport-related lists